Troy Mann (born September 3, 1969) is a Canadian former professional ice hockey player who most recently served as head coach of the Belleville Senators of the American Hockey League (AHL).

Born in Campbellton, New Brunswick, Mann began his professional playing career in 1995 with the Saginaw Wheels of the Colonial Hockey League, and played 10 seasons in the professional minor leagues before retiring as a player following the 2004-05 season when he served as a playing assistant coach with the CHL's Topeka Tarantulas. He focused on a coaching career with the 2005–06 ECHL season when he was hired as an assistant coach with the Columbia Inferno, becoming their head coach the following season.

Mann served as an assistant coach with the Hershey Bears of the AHL for four years. After he was passed over in the Bears' vacant head coaching search, he moved to the Bakersfield Condors of the ECHL. On July 2, 2014, after a successful season with the Condors, Mann returned to the Bears as head coach. He was released after four seasons with the Bears, earning an overall 162–102–22–18 record, but failing to make the playoffs in his fourth season. He was hired on June 25, 2018, as the head coach of the Belleville Senators in the AHL.

References

External links

1969 births
Living people
Bakersfield Condors (1998–2015) players
Canadian ice hockey centres
Elmira Jackals (UHL) players
Flint Generals players
Hampton Roads Admirals players
Jackson Bandits players
Mississippi Sea Wolves players
Missouri River Otters players
People from Campbellton, New Brunswick
Saginaw Gears (UHL) players
Saginaw Wheels players
San Angelo Saints players
Tallahassee Tiger Sharks players
Topeka Tarantulas players
Hershey Bears coaches
Canadian expatriate ice hockey players in the United States
Canadian ice hockey coaches